Foothill woodland is a California vegetation type characterized by an overstory of broadleaf and coniferous trees, generally found in areas of higher elevations and more precipitation than grasslands and oak savannah, and at lower elevations and less precipitation than mixed coniferous.

Sierra Nevada range
Growing season is 6–10 months.

In the Sierra Nevada range, it is characterized by a dominant overstory of Foothill Pine (Pinus sabiniana), Blue Oak (Quercus douglasii), Interior Live Oak (Quercus chrysolepis), California Black Oak (Quercus kelloggii), California Buckeye (Aesculus californica), and understory plants including Ceanothus spp., Toyon (Heteromeles arbutifolia), Dogwood (Cornus spp.), and Redbud (Cercis occidentalis). It is often found on north facing slopes there is more moisture in the soils from protection from the sun (slope effect).

Regional decline 
Foothill Woodlands have declined as a result of development. In California counties, 64% have noted decreases greater than 5%. More residential commercial development has been occurring. A number of range lands have and continue to be converted.

See also
California interior chaparral and woodlands — sub-ecoregion, including the Sierra Nevada foothills.
List of Sierra Nevada plants in the Foothill Woodland and Chaparral Zone.
 — flora of ecoregion.
Sierra Nevada lower montane forest — sub-ecoregion at adjacent higher elevations.

References

Forests of the Sierra Nevada (United States)
Natural history of the California chaparral and woodlands